CactusCon was the fourth North American Science Fiction Convention, held in Phoenix, Arizona, on September 3–7, 1987.

CactusCon may also refer to:
 CactusCon (computer security conference), a computer security conference held annually in Mesa, Arizona
 Cactus Con, fictional subject of "The Great Cactus Con", an episode of Henry Danger